Acetatifactor is a bacterial genus from the family of Lachnospiraceae. Up to now there is only one species of this genus known (Acetatifactor muris).

References

Lachnospiraceae
Monotypic bacteria genera
Bacteria genera